The 1950 Cincinnati Bearcats football team was an American football team that represented the University of Cincinnati as a member of the Mid-American Conference (MAC) during the 1950 college football season. Led by second-year head coach Sid Gillman, the Bearcats compiled an overall record of 8–4 with a mark of 3–1 in conference play, placing second in the MAC. Cincinnati  was invited to the Sun Bowl, where they lost to West Texas State.

Schedule

References

Cincinnati
Cincinnati Bearcats football seasons
Cincinnati Bearcats football